Bhainsa is a town in Nirmal district of the Indian state of Telangana. It is the headquarters of Bhainsa mandal and Bhainsa revenue division. It is bordered with Bhokar Thaluka, Nanded Jilla, Maharashtra State on west and Nizamabad district on South. It has an average elevation of 363 meters (1194 feet).

Demographics 
 India census, the city of Bhainsa had a population of 49,764. Males constitute 52% of the population and females 48%. Bhainsa has an average literacy rate of 54%, lower than the national average of 59.5%; with 60% of the males and 40% of the females literate. 17% of the population is under 6 years of age. It's communally sensitive. According to the 2011 census, the Hindus are 49.06% and Muslims are 46.94%. In the Mandal as a whole, the population is 89,417, of which the Hindus are 67.44% and Muslims are 29.27%.

Government and politics 

Civic administration

Bhainsa Municipality was constituted in 1994 and is classified as a first grade municipality with 32 election wards.

Controversies

The town had witnessed multiple communal riots in the past few years. The town police authorities had come under criticism for not handling the communal clashes properly.

Villages

Places of worship 

 Lord Krishna Shrine temple dates back to the period of Kalyani Chalukyas. The region has witnessed the glory of various dynasties that have seen the imprint of the hallmark structures and other structures of heritage significance.

The temple located in Bhainsa village consists of garbhagriha, antarala and pillared mandapa that adorn the various directions of the Temple. The central four pillars show some of the best sculptural representations. Shaivite dwarapalas (carrying damaru, trisula, gada etc. in their hands) are carved here on antarala doorjambs and dwarapala sculptures at the entrance of the temple. Due to this evidence, it was once considered to be a Shaiva Temple, but there was no presence of Shivalinga in the garbhagriha. Presently it is known as Gopalji Temple/Gopalkrishna mandir since the temple now has a Krishna idol which is kept here in the garbhagriha and worshipped by the local people. A Vaishnava temple, with structures belonging to Shaivism is considered unique and hence this temple is popular with historians, for its impressive history as well as the sculptures that adorn the walls and pillars.

 Narasimha Mandir
 Mahishmati Temple Mysamma Mandir
 Shiva Temple
 Sri Mahadev Mandir
 Saibaba Temple
 Borra Ganesh Mandir
 Jatashankar Mandir 
 Shani Mandir

Agriculture 
Major crops include cotton, paddy, maize, vegetables and sugarcane.  == PROJECT ==

Gaddenavagu or Suddavagu is a medium Irrigation project across Suddavagu which is tributary of Godavari near Bhainsa in Nirmal district. The reservoir is situated at a distance of 2 Km North-West of Bhainsa. The project grounded in the year constituency. The project is commenced in 2000 and completed during 2006.

The project provides Irrigation potential to 20 villages in Lokeshwaram, Bhainsa, and Mudhole mandals for irrigating an ayacut of 14000 Acres and also drinking water supply to Bhainsa town and 237 villages of Mudhole. Districts and Mandals benefited Lokeshwaram, Bhainsa, and Mudhole mandals of Nirmal District IrrigationPotential (in Acres):- Provides ayacut of 14000 Acres in 20 villages of Nirmal district.

References

External links

Cities and towns in Adilabad district
Mandal headquarters in Adilabad district